Carlos Banda may refer to:
Carlos Banda (footballer, born 1977), Swedish footballer
Carlos Banda (footballer, born 1978), Swedish footballer and football manager